B110 may refer to:
 B110 (New York City bus), a privately operated bus route in Brooklyn, United States
 Dell Dimension B110, a desktop computer
 B110 series, a Nissan Sunny car series
 Nepean Highway, a road in Victoria, Australia
 Bellarine Highway, a road in Victoria, Australia
 A bus service serving Mid Valley Megamall in Kuala Lumpur, Malaysia
 , a German torpedo-boat